Cain bairns or kain bairns were infants who, according to Scottish superstition, were seized by warlocks and witches, and paid as a tax or tithe to the Devil. Càin is a Gaelic word for a tribute, tax or tithe, and is the origin of the Lowland Scots term "kane", while "bairn" means a child.

The word was in use along the Scottish Borders, according to Walter Scott's Minstrelsy of the Scottish Border.

It is unconnected with Cain in the Bible.

Notes

References
 MacKay, Charles (1888). A Dictionary of Lowland Scotch. Ticknor.

Christian folklore
Infancy
Scottish folklore
Witchcraft in folklore and mythology
Witchcraft in Scotland